Dimitris Raspas (born 1 April 2001) is a Cypriot footballer who plays as a forward for Othellos Athienou, on loan from AEK Larnaca.

Career
On 13 May 2018, Raspas made his senior debut for AEK Larnaca, playing the 67 minutes in a 3-2 win over AEL Limassol. On 4 October 2018, he scored his first ever senior goal two minutes after coming on as a substitute in a 4-2 loss to Bayer Leverkusen in the UEFA Europa League.

Career statistics

Club

Honours
AEK Larnaca
 Cypriot Super Cup: 2018

References

Living people
2001 births
Cypriot footballers
Association football forwards
Cypriot First Division players
AEK Larnaca FC players
Othellos Athienou F.C. players
Cyprus youth international footballers